Cody Webb  (born May 31, 1988), is an American professional motorcycle trials rider and endurocross racer. Webb was the 2010 United States NATC Motorcycle Trials Champion.

Webb has also competed in EnduroX. At the X Games he has claimed silver medals in Foz do Iguaçu 2013 and Los Angeles 2012 and 2014, as well as bronze medals in Los Angeles 2013 and Barcelona 2013. Also, he has won the 2014, 2015 and 2017 AMA EnduroCross Championship.

Biography
Born in Watsonville, California, Webb turned professional in 2003 after clinching the NATC Expert title, moving into the Pro class for the final three rounds of the series.

Webb won his first Pro series trial in Tennessee in 2006, going on to finish 2nd in the championship behind Geoff Aaron. Early in the season Webb also clinched the prestigious El Trial de Espana for the first time, an event put on by the SoCal Trials Association.

Cody Webb continued to be a contender for the title over the next few years, winning the NATC Indoor Championship in 2007 and finishing runner-up to Patrick Smage in 2007.

Webb was becoming a favorite at the El Trial de Espana event, winning the event back to back in 2008 and 2009.

After winning nine of the ten national rounds of the 2010 NATC Pro series, Webb gained the title he had fought Smage for over many seasons, then signed a contract to ride with the factory Beta team in 2011.

In 2011 Smage regained his title with Webb again finishing runner-up. Webb did regain his El Trial de Espana title though.

National Trials Championship Career

Honors
 NATC Expert Trials Champion 2003
 NATC Pro Trials Champion 2010
 AMA Endurocross Champion 2014
 AMA Endurocross Champion 2015
 RedBull Signature Series - Hare Scramble (2nd) 2016

Related reading
 NATC Trials Championship
 FIM Trial World Championship

References

External links
 

1988 births
Living people
American motorcycle racers
Motorcycle trials riders
Enduro riders
People from Watsonville, California